John Schaller (July 7, 1912 – 1978) was a member of the Wisconsin State Assembly.

Biography
Schaller was born on July 7, 1912 in Augsburg, Germany. He moved to Milwaukee, Wisconsin in 1913. He died in 1978. He was a member of the International Association of Machinists, the Fathers and Brothers Marine Club, and the St. Boniface Holy Name Society.

Career
Schaller was elected to the Assembly in 1948 as a Democrat.

References

Bavarian emigrants to the United States
Politicians from Milwaukee
Democratic Party members of the Wisconsin State Assembly
1912 births
1978 deaths
20th-century American politicians